Kunbi (alternatively Kanbi) is a generic term applied to castes of traditional farmers in Western India. These include the Dhonoje, Ghatole, Hindre, Jadav, Jhare, Khaire, Lewa (Leva Patil), Lonare and Tirole communities of Vidarbha. The communities are largely found in the state of Maharashtra but also exist in the states of Madhya Pradesh, Gujarat, Karnataka, Kerala and Goa. Kunbis are included among the Other Backward Classes (OBC) in Maharashtra.

Most of the Mavalas serving in the armies of the Maratha Empire under Shivaji came from this community. The Shinde and Gaekwad dynasties of the Maratha Empire are originally of Kunbi origin. In the fourteenth century and later, several Kunbis who had taken up employment as military men in the armies of various rulers underwent a process of Sanskritisation and began to identify themselves as Marathas. The boundary between the Marathas and the Kunbi became obscure in the early 20th century due to the effects of colonisation, and the two groups came to form one block, the Maratha-Kunbi.

Tensions along caste lines between the Kunbi and the Dalit communities were seen in the Khairlanji killings, and the media have reported sporadic instances of violence against Dalits. Other inter-caste issues include the forgery of caste certificates by politicians, mostly in the grey Kunbi-Maratha caste area, to allow them to run for elections from wards reserved for OBC candidates. In April 2005, the Supreme Court of India ruled that the Marathas are not a sub-caste of Kunbis.

Etymology 
According to the Anthropological Survey of India, the term Kunbi is derived from kun and bi meaning "people" and "seeds", respectively. Conjoined, the two terms mean "those who germinate more seeds from one seed". Another etymology states that Kunbi is believed to have come from the Marathi word kunbawa, or Sanskrit kur, meaning "agricultural tillage". Yet another etymology states that Kunbi derives from kutumba ("family"), or from the Dravidian kul, "husbandman" or "cultivator". Thus anyone who took up the occupation of a cultivator could be brought under the generic term Kunbi. G. S. Ghurye has posited that while the term may "signify the occupation of the group, viz., that of cultivation ... it is not improbable that the name may be of tribal origin."

Marriages 
Like other Maharashtrian communities such as Marathas, Malis etc., the marriage of a man to his maternal uncle's daughter is common in the Kunbi community. Maratha and Kunbis intermarried in a hypergamous way i.e. a rich Kunbi's daughter could always marry a poor Maratha. Anthropologist Donald Attwood shows giving an example of the Karekars of Ahmednagar that this trend continues even in recent times indicating that the social order between the two is fluid and flexible.

Maratha-Kunbi 
Very little information was recorded prior to the 19th century regarding the significantly large group of Maharashtrian agricultural castes, known as Maratha-Kunbis. Both individual terms, Kunbi and Maratha are equally complex. In the fourteenth century, the term Maratha (among other meanings) referred to all speakers of the Marathi language. An example of this is the record of the Moroccan traveler Ibn Battuta whose use of the term included multiple castes who spoke Marathi. Several years later, as the Bahamani kings started employing the local population in their military, the term Maratha acquired a martial connotation. Those who were not associated with the term Maratha and were not untouchables began to identify themselves as Kunbi. According to Stewart Gordon, the so-called Marathas now differentiated themselves from the others such as the cultivators (Kunbi), iron-workers and tailors. At lower status levels, the term Kunbi was applied to those who tilled the land. It was possible for outsiders to become Kunbi, an example of which was recorded by Enthoven. Enthoven observed that it was common for Kolis (fishermen) to take up agriculture and become Kunbis. In the eighteenth century, under the Peshwas, newer waves of villagers joined the armies of the Maratha Empire. These men began to see themselves as Marathas too, further obscuring the boundary between the Marathas and Kunbi, giving rise to a new category: Maratha-Kunbi. While this view of the term was common among colonial European observers of the eighteenth century, they were ignorant of the caste connotations of the term. The dividing line between the Maratha and Kunbi was obscure, but there was evidence of certain families who called themselves Assall Marathas or true Marathas. The Assal Marathas claimed to be Kshatriyas in the Varna hierarchy and claimed lineage from the Rajput clans of north India. The rest, the Kunbi, accepted that they came lower in the Varna hierarchy. Karve says that the Maratha caste precipitated from the Kunbi through the Sanskritisation process, the two were later consolidated due to social reforms as well as political and economic development during British rule in the early 20th century.

The British installed Chatrapati Pratapsinh Bhonsle, a descendant of Shivaji, noted in his diary in the 1820s–1830s that the Gaekwads (another powerful Maratha dynasty) had Kunbi origins. He notes further "These days, when the Kunbis and others grow wealthy, they try to pollute our caste. If this goes on, dharma itself will not remain. Each man should stick to his own caste, but in spite of this these men are trying to spread money around in our caste. But make no mistake, all Kshatriyas will look to protect their caste in this matter." Later, in September 1965, the Marathi Dnyan Prasarak newspaper published a piece which addressed the changing meaning of the term Maratha, the social mobility of the day, the origins of the Maratha-Kunbi castes, the eating habits and the living conditions of the people of Maharashtra. The author of the piece claims that only a very small circle of families, like those of Shivaji Bhonsale, can claim the Kshatriya status. He also states that these Kshatriya families have not been able to stop the inroads made by the wealthy and powerful Kunbis, who had bought their way into Kshatriya status through wealth and inter-marriages. Of the most powerful Maratha dynasties, the Shindes (later anglicised to Scindia) were of Kunbi origin. A "Marathaisation" of the Kunbis was seen between the censuses of 1901 and 1931, which shows a gradually declining number of Kunbis resulting from more of them identifying themselves as Marathas. Lele notes in 1990 that a subset of the Maratha-Kunbi group of castes became the political elite in the state of Maharashtra in the 1960s and 1970s and have remained so to the present day. The elite Maratha-Kunbis have institutionalised their ideology of agrarian development through their control of the Congress party. The state Government of Maharashtra does not recognise a group called Maratha-Kunbi.

According to Irawati Karve, the Marata-Kunbi form over 40% of the population of Western Maharashtra. Later in 1990, Lele records that the Maratha-Kunbi group of castes account for 31% of the population, distributed over the whole of Maharashtra.

Kunbi communities from Vidarbha region of Maharashtra 

In Maharashtra, the Kunbi communities include the Dhonoje, Ghatole, Hindre, Jadav, Jhare, Khaire, Lewa (Leva Patil), Lonari and the Tirole communities.
According to the Anthropological Survey of India, the Jadav and Tirole self-identify as Kshatriya, the Leva as Vaishya, and the rest as Shudra. The Lonari used to refer to themselves as Chhatriya Lonari Kunbi, but they dropped the Chhatriya after their inclusion in the classification "Other Backward Classes." The names of subsets of the Kunbi in Berar Province, according to Edward Balfour, were Tirale, Maratha, Bawane, Khaire, Khedule, and Dhanoje. In a strict interpretation of the caste system, the word Kunbi does not identify a caste but rather a status, like the word Rajput, for example. All Kunbi communities of Maharashtra speak Marathi and use the Devanagri script for written communication. In Gujarat, the Anthropological Survey of India records that Kunbis have benefited economically from government development programmes. While both boys and girls receive formal education, the drop-out rate of girls is higher due to economic reasons. While the diet of Kunbi communities varies between vegetarianism and non-vegetarianism, most (perhaps all) abstain from the consumption of pork and beef.

Like numerous other communities such as the Mahar, Mehra, Bhil, Koli, and the Brahmin groups, the Kunbi perceive themselves as an indigenous community.

Dhonoje 
The Kunbi Dhonoje are primarily a community of land-owning agriculturists with deep roots in Maharashtra, although their origin and historical background are unknown. Their home districts are primarily the Chandrapur, Gadchiroli, Bhandara and Nagpur districts of the Vidarbha region in Maharashtra. The Anthropological Survey of India records in 2003 that while Hindi is spoken by when communicating with outsiders, the women of the community can only understand Hindi—they cannot speak it. The Dhonoje observe strict endogamy; most marriages are arranged by family elders. Kunbi Dhonoje males marry between 20 and 25 whereas the females marry between 18 and 22.

Dhonojes engage a Brahmin priest for conducting their marriage, birth and death rituals. Cremation of the dead is the norm; burial the exception for those less than 11 years of age. Common places of pilgrimage include Nashik, Pandharpur, Ramtek and Tuljapur. Important Hindu festivals observed include Vaisakhi, Akadi, Yatra, Rakshabandhan, Dussera, Diwali and Holi. All women and most men are vegetarian though some are occasional non-vegetarians.

Most Dhonojes live in extended families. There are, however, an increasing number of nuclear families, resulting from urban migration and a break from traditional occupations. In a multiethnic village, it is not possible to tell Kunbi Dhonoje by their surname alone. Formal education has had a positive impact on the younger generation of the Dhonoje women.

Ghatole 

The community name Ghatole is derived from Ghat meaning a hilly range. The community belongs mainly to the western part of the Vidarbha region of Maharashtra. Oral tradition speaks of their arrival from the Sahyadris in Panchimhat. In Vidarbha, they live mostly in the Aurangabad, Nashik, Buldhana, Amravati, Yavatmal, Parbhani and Akola districts. The Ghatole claim to be the same as the economically and numerically superior Tirole or Tilole. Per their oral tradition, those families which interrupted their migration march from the Ghats became the Ghatole whereas those who continued their journey eastwards became the Tirole Kunbi. Despite the oral tradition, the two communities are now two distinct communities due to geographical barriers the strict practice of endogamy. All women and most men are vegetarian though some are occasionally non-vegetarians who keep their utensils separate and cook outside of the family kitchen. Marriages are generally arranged and families are extended rather than nuclear. Locations of pilgrimage are Nasik, Shirdi, Tuljapur and Pandharpur. According to a report in 2009, the Ghatole Kunbi community in the Akola and Washim areas of Vidarbha prefer the Shivsena political party.

Hindre 
The Kunbi Hindre (or Hendre) are synonymous with the Hindre Patils, as far as their perceived distribution in the Vidarbha region of Maharashtra in the districts of Nanded, Parbhani, Yeotmal and Akola is concerned. There are no further subdivisions of the community. The community is said to have migrated from the Sahyadri ranges to the central Vidarbha region. The community does not have an oral tradition concerning the etymology of the word Hindre or the history of their migration, so their own origin is unknown to them. While the Hindre were grouped with the Kunbis of the Khandesh region in early ethnographical studies, the origin of the community is not known. Their population has not been accurately recorded in any official records; since the community is only found in certain rural districts, the Anthropological Survey of India estimates their population to be in thousands or in lakhs. While the traditional occupation of the Hindre Kunbis is agriculture, better educational opportunities and urbanisation have resulted in a disruption of their traditional economy, which has caused many Hindre to pursue diversified occupations.

The main language of the community is Marathi with Devanagri script for written communication. Community members who visit urban areas for business reasons are able to communicate in broken Hindi. The communities' traditional dress is similar to that of other peer communities. All women and the majority of the men are vegetarians. Consumption of tea is common, mainly to overcome fatigue.

Hindre are strictly endogamous and their marriages are arranged. Child marriages were practiced in the past but the age of marriage in 2003 was recorded to be between 20–25 for males and 17–22 for females. Cremation of the dead is the norm; stillborn babies and those who died after a few months are buried. Brahmin priests are employed for the Hindu rituals. The main festivals of the Hindre include Vaishakhi, Akhadi, Yatra, Rakshabandhan, Dussera and Holi. Places of pilgrimage include Pandharpur, Tuljapur, Ramtek, Nashik and Saptashringi. The traditional caste council which existed in the 20th century for solving social issues like divorce has been supplanted by the statutory gram panchayat of the state government. Common surnames are Jaitale, Wankhed, Chouhan, Gawande, Mahale, Bhoir, Choudhary and Jadhav; it is not possible to identify a Hindre Kunbi on the basis of surname alone in a multi-ethnic village. Changes in surnames have been recorded, an example of which is the changing of Chouhan to Jaitale.

Jadhav 
It is not known how the Jadhav came to be known by that name or when and how they were brought under the generic term Kunbi. The home districts of the Jadhav Kunbi are Amaravati, Yavatmal and Nagpur. The community is strictly endogamous; consanguinal marriages with maternal cousins are preferred over those with the paternal. However, the number of marriages of such nature are low. Marriages are arranged. The preferred minimum age is 22 for males and 18 for females, though these ages are increasing as of 2003. Cremation of the dead is the norm, burial being the exception for children and for those who have died of snake bites. Brahmins are employed for naming and marriage ceremonies.
Surnames are varied, their origins unknown. They are generally formed from the place of their dwelling, key events in the family past, or a reference to an animate or inanimate object. Among the rural Jadhavs, the traditional caste council has been replaced by the Akhil Bharatiya Jadhav Kunbi Samaj, a registered regional council located in Nagpur which also engages in social work. The rulings of the statutory gram panchayat are followed at the village level. Jadhav males are non-vegetarian but the women generally do not eat meat.
There are no further subdivisions amongst the Jadhavs.

Jhare or Jhade 

The name of the Jhade or Jhare Kunbi community (also known as the Jhadpi) comes from Jhadi, meaning "forest". The home districts of the Jhade are Nagpur, Bhandara, Akola and Amravati. The Jhade of the Bhadara district are also known as the Bowne, meaning "52" in Marathi, due to the high revenue of  5.2 million generated by them for the Mughal administration. In 1916, the Jhade were recorded by Russsell and Hiralal to be members of the Gond people. The same ethnographic records state that the Jhade are the earliest immigrants to the Nagpur area. Contemporaries Jhade and Bowne contest that claim, since the Jhade do not have oral tradition which records a migration. Marriages are arranged; typical ages are between 22 and 25 for men and between 16 and 20 for women. Marriages with maternal cousins are preferred. Cremation of the dead is the norm, the exceptions being those who die before the age of five. The Jhade do not employ the services of a Brahmin priest for death rites. Common Jhade surnames are Katode, Jhanjad, Toukar, Baraskar, Khokle, Shende, Bhoie, Dhenge, Tejare, Bandobhnje, Waghaye, Trichkule, Baraskar, Khawas and Bhuse. The Anthropological Survey of India states in 2003 that the Jhade boys and girls have access to formal education and mostly go on to attain high school education. The Survey also states that the community has access to modern day amenities like electricity, health centres, motorable roads, public transport, post offices, drinking water and fair price shops of the Indian Public Distribution System.

Khaire 
The Kunbi Khaire derive their name from the local name for catechu, Khair, which the community has traditionally cultivated. The home districts of the community are Chandrapur and Gadchiroli where they are also known as Khedule Kunbi. The community is endogamous and practices arranged marriages; the typical age of marriage for men and women is between 20–25 and 18–22 respectively. Cremation of the dead is the norm, burial is an exception for the economically disadvantaged who cannot afford cremation. Kunbi Khaire men are occasional non-vegetarians whereas the women are vegetarian. Borkte, Kukorkar, Lambade, Tiwade, Thakur, Chatur, Pal, Dhake, Elule, Sangre, Tangre and Timare are a few of the Khaire surnames. Important festivals observed by the community are Dussera, Diwali, Holi and Ganeshchaturthi. Traditional places of pilgrimage are Pandharpur, Nasik, Ramtek and Tuljapur.

The use of the traditional jati panchayats have lonce since been discontinued by the Khaire community which now makes use of the gram panchayat, while still consulting community elders for some social disputes. The Anthropological Survey of India states in 2003 that the Khaire boys and girls have access to formal education and mostly go on to attain high school education, sometimes further when conditions are favourable. Drop out rates for girls are higher for social reasons. The Survey also states that the community has access to modern day amenities of electricity, health centres, motorable roads, public transport, post offices, drinking water and fair price shops of the Indian Public Distribution System.

Leva or Leva Patil 

The Leva or Lewa are synonymous with the Lewa Patil—the suffix Patil is a feudal title. The community does not have an oral history of their origin or migration, but they generally accept that they migrated from Gujarat to the Vidarbha region via Nimar (now part of Madhya Pradesh). The community is associated with two other communities from Gujarat: the Lewa and the Lewa Patidar. The former are a well known community; the latter are sometimes referred to as their parental group, but the Kunbi Leva Patil of Maharashtra have roots which are long established in the Kunbi community of Maharashtra. The community perceives their distribution to be in 72 villages in the Jalgaon and Buldhana districts. The Lewa Patil are numerically, economically and educationally superior in some of the multi-ethnic villages of the Buldhana and Jalgaon district. Nuclear families are replacing the traditional extended family system due to a changing economy and an increasing number of conflicts over property inheritance. Cremation of the dead is the norm, burial the exception for the very young (up to three to four months old). There is no distinctive attire of the Leva community—they follow local fashion trends. On very rare occasions, older Leva men wear a Gujarati style, boat shaped topi or hat made from black or brown silk. Some of the common Leva surnames are Warade (Deshmukh), Narkhede, Kharche, Supe, Borle, Panchpande and Kolte. Dowry is not practiced in the Leva community today. The attitude towards formal education is positive though Leva girls drop out of school earlier due to social conditions.

Lonari 

The Lonari Kunbis are regarded as one of the established cultivating communities in Maharashtra. The Lonari are presently located in the eastern part of the Vidarbha region and in the adjoining districts of Madhya Pradesh. The name of the community comes from Lonar lake in the Mehkar-Chikhli taluka of the Buldhana district, where their original occupation was salt-making. They migrated from the Lonar lake region and eventually arrived in present-day Maharashtra. The oral history of the community contains an elaborate story of their migration. According to tradition, the community migrated to Aurgangabad from their original place of origin in the Lucknow district of Uttar Pradesh, then to Buldana and finally to their current locations in the Amravati and Betul districts of Maharashtra and Madhya Pradesh, respectively. In the two tehsils of Multai and Warud in Madhya Pradesh and Maharashra, respectively, the Lonari Kunbi are also known as Deshmukhs and Kumbhares. The Lonari now rely on the gram panchayats under the state government as changes in the sociopolitical landscape have diminished the influence of the traditional caste council. Monogamy and adult marriages are the norm, but marriages among identical surnames (referred to as hargote) is not allowed. According to the Lonari Kunbi community, they do not engage in the practice of dowry The Lonari Kunbis follow the joint family system, but restrictions on land-owning for agriculture under the Land Revenue Act and the improved educational status of newer generations has caused nuclear families to form. A large number of community members depend on revenue from agriculture, either by cultivating their own lands or working as agricultural labour. The Lonari Kunbi community has made much progress since the 1950s, but problem of poverty is still prevalent and economic instability is still a concern to community members.

Tirole or Tirale 
The Kunbi Tirole are an agricultural community found in the Khandesh region of Maharashtra. The community believe that they are Rajputs who migrated from Rajasthan as a result of a general migration of the tribes of Rajputana. Older ethnographic accounts note that a large scale migration of the community occurred from Rajasthan to Maharashtra in the 18th century under the reign of Raghuji Bhonsle. The community enjoys a high social status among other agricultural communities. One reason for their high social status is the fact that some families were chosen to collect revenue in the days of the Maratha Empire. Two separate etymologies exist for the community name. One states that the community is named after the place of their origin: Therol, in Rajasthan. The other states that the community gets its name from their original occupation of Til, or sesame cultivation. The population of the Tirole is greater than that of all other Kunbi communities. Their home districts are Nagpur, Wardha, Amravati and Yeotmal. Although occasional non-vegetarian men are found in the community, the community is mainly and traditionally vegetarian.

Based on evidence from an old Marathi document, Karve concludes that the Tirole Kunbi differ significantly from the Kubis west of Nagpur, and that they did not formerly claim to be Kshatriyas. G. S Ghurye states that Karve's statement is either esoteric or wrong.

Another agricultural community, the Kunbi Ghatole, claim that they are the same as the Tirole.

Kunbi communities in other states 

In Gujarat, Kunbi communities are found in the Dangs, Surat and Valsad districts. In 2003, Singh and Lal described the Kunbi of Gujarat as being non-vegetarian and consumers of alcoholic drinks such as mohua. That particular community believes itself to be of a higher status than some other local groups due to the type of meat which they consume (for example, they believe that the Warlis eat rats, and other groups eat beef). The community practices monogamous endogamy; marriage of cross cousins is acceptable, as is remarriage by widows. Divorce is permitted and the practice of marriage around the age of 10–12 years has been abandoned. The dead are cremated.

The Charotar (Anand) region, tilled by the Lewa Kunbis, had been well-known since the 15th century for high productivity levels which produced potentially high-revenue crops like cotton and food grains. The Lewa community of the region were regarded among the most industrious by colonial officials.

By the 18th century, Gujarati Kunbis distinguished themselves by two sub-categories: those who continued their traditional occupation as agriculturists, and those who had taken up revenue collection. The former were known as Kunbis and the latter as Patidars. While these two sub-communities resided in the same villages, they did not inter-dine or inter-marry. There was some confusion in the nomenclature of the community during the second half of the 19th century when colonial officials referred to elites simply as Kunbis. On other occasions the two sub-communities were collectively referred to as the Patidars.

The changes implemented to land tenure policy during the colonial era led to the ascendency of the Kunbis in central Gujarat. The Kunbis and the fishermen Kolis were not too different in their socio-economic position until the end of the 19th century. With the aid of favourable policies, the Kunbis were able to transform themselves into a prosperous caste by the time of the 1931 census, in which they had renamed themselves Patidars. The etymology of term Patidar, which implied a higher economic status due to land-ownership, comes from one who holds pieces of land called patis.

A population of Kunbi (locally called Kurumbi) is also found in Goa, where they are believed to be descendants of the area's aboriginal inhabitants. They are largely poor agriculturalists, though some of the oldest known landowners in Goa were of this class, and claimed for themselves the Vaishya (merchant) varna. According to the leaders of the Uttara Kannada district Kunabi Samaj Seva Sangh, the population of their community in the region is 75,000.

Role in politics of Maharashtra

Vidarbha
The Kunbis, along with the Teli and the Mali, play a major role in the politics of the Vidarbha region of Maharashtra. The three groups compose 50% of the electorate and are known to influence election outcomes. The Kunbis, being landlords, hold the upper-hand in the politics of the region and can decide the outcome of at least 22 seats, since they are dominant in every village of the region. The Kunbis, who are known to have a more tolerant attitude and are more secular than the Telis, prefer the Congress Party. As a result, the Party has held a dominant position in the region for several decades. However, in the last decade or so, Congress has ignored the Kunbis and other parties like the Bharatiya Janata Party; Shiv Sena responded by giving more opportunities to Kunbi candidates in elections.

In the 2009 elections, resentment by the Kunbis towards the Congress candidate Wamanrao Kasawar was said to benefit Sanjay Derkar, the independent NCP rebel candidate, in a triangular contest which also included Shiv Sena's Vishvas Nandekar. In the 2004 MLA elections in Murbad, the Kunbi vote was said to be the deciding vote in favour of Digambar Vishe, a BJP candidate belonging to the Kunbi community.

According to the Indian Express, soon after its inception in May 1999 the Nationalist Congress Party (NCP) worked hard to get rid of its "Kunbi Only" image. Sharad Pawar found, after breaking away from the Congress, that it was not possible to win elections with just the Kunbi vote. In order to attract the non-Kunbi OBC vote, estimated to form 40% of the electorate, Pawar recruited Chhagan Bhujbal (a Mali), and Pandurang Hajare (a Teli). Even though Pawar recruited other Telis like Pandurang Dhole, the Indian Express wondered if it would be enough to counter the age-old and keen Kunbi versus Teli rivalry. A closer look at local and regional leaders in the NCP revealed that almost all of them belonged to the Kunbi community. In 2009, the NCP president Sharad Pawar chose Anil Deshmukh over Rajendra Shingane as party candidate from the Vidarbha region because he represented the huge Kunbi-Marathi community there.

OBC vote politics 
According to Thomas Blom Hansen, a commentator on religious and political violence in India, the failure of political parties to consolidate OBC votes in Maharashtra, despite calls for "Kunbi-zation" of the Maratha caste, was because Maharashtra had, as early as 1967, identified 183 communities as "educationally backward classes". By 1978 there were 199 communities in this category, and the government implemented a policy of reserving 10% of educational seats and government jobs for them.
The official data used by the government for the definition of the Maratha-Kunbi castes puts them between 30% and 40%, depending on whether a narrow or an inclusive definition of the caste is used. This causes the percentage of OBCs to vary between 29% and 38% of the population. According to Hansen, it is critically important for the politicians of the state to ensure a narrow definition of OBC and maximise the Maratha representation. The Maratha Mahasangha (All-Maratha Federation), fearing that the Mandal Commission would divide the Maratha-Kunbis into Kunbis and high Marathas, took an anti-Mandal stance and tried to attract marginalised Maratha-Kunbis by propagating martial and chauvinistic myths, which in turn stigmatized Muslims and Dalits. While the organization never received success outside of Mumbai, it showed that political leaders were willing to counter the rising OBC assertiveness.

Forgery of caste certificates 
There are several communities in Maharashtra that have been trying to pass themselves off as depressed in order to reap the benefits of the reservation. An issue of candidates of the Maratha caste (a non-backward caste) running for elections in wards reserved for OBC candidates got centre-stage attention in the 2007 civic polls after the Maharashtra state government amended the OBC list on 1 June 2004 to retain the Kunbis and include Kunbi-Marathas. In 2010, the independent corporator, Malan Bhintade, who claimed to be Kunbi-Maratha but was later found to be of Maratha caste, lost her membership of the Pune Municipal Corporation after it was established that she had submitted a false caste certificate, claiming to be Kunbi-Maratha in order to run for elections in wards reserved for OBC candidates. Subsequently, all candidates who lost to Kunbi-Maratha candidates registered complaints against their opponents by claiming falsification of certificates. A similar case of forgery was reported in 2003 when the former Shiv Sena corporator, Geeta Gore, was sent to jail for falsely claiming to be a Kunbi-Maratha. Gore won in elections from ward 18 of Andheri (west) by claiming to be a member of the Kunbi-Maratha caste.

Inter-caste issues

Violence 
In 2006, four members of a Dalit family were tortured and murdered by members of the Kunbi caste from the Khairlanji village in the Bhandara district. Two female members of the same family were paraded naked in the village and then raped. Eight villagers were sentenced to life imprisonment, with the court declaring the killings motivated by revenge and not racism or casteism. An appeal against the High Court judgement to have the crime declared as casteism is still pending in the Supreme Court of India.

The Times of India reported in February 2011 that an honour killing of a Dalit man and Kunbi woman was suspected in Murbad of the Thane district.
In September of the same year, a 20-year-old Dalit woman alleged that she was raped by a Someshwar Baburao Kuthe of the Kunbi caste in the Sarandi (Bujaruk) village of Lakhandur taluka. The local police registered an offense.

Marathas and Kunbi affiliation 

Modern research has revealed that the Marathas and Kunbi have the same origin - although the two are treated as two different communities currently on a social level. Most recently, the Kunbi origin of the Maratha has been explained in detail by Professor Richard Eaton from the University of Arizona and Professor Stewart Gordon from the University of Michigan. Marathas ("Assal" or true i.e. belonging to 96 clans), who were distinguished from the Kunbi, in the past claimed genealogical connections with Rajputs of Northern India. However, modern researchers demonstrate, giving examples, that these claims are not factual. Modern scholars agree that Marathas and Kunbi are the same. Anthropologist J.V.Ferreira, from the University of Mumbai states: "The Maratha claim to belong to the ancient 96 Kshatriya families has no foundation in fact and may have been adopted after the Marathas became with Shivaji a power to be reckoned with". Eaton shows how the Maratha caste was generated from the Kunbis who served the Muslim rulers, prospered, and over time adopted different customs like different dressing styles, employed genealogists, started identifying as Maratha, and caste boundaries solidified between them. In the nineteenth century, economic prosperity rather than marital service to the Muslims replaced the mobility into Maratha identity. Eaton gives an example of the Holkar family that originally belonged to the Dhangar(Shepherd) caste but was given a Maratha or even an "arch-Maratha" identity. The other example, given by Professor Susan Bayly of Cambridge University, is of the Bhonsles who originated among the populations of the Deccani tiller-plainsmen who were known by the names Kunbi and Maratha. 
Professor Dhanmanjiri Sathe from the University of Pune states that "The line between Marathas and Kunbis is thin and sometimes difficult to ascertain". Iravati Karve, Anthropologist, University of Pune, showed how the Maratha caste was generated from Kunbis who simply started calling themselves "Maratha". She states that Maratha, Kunbi and Mali are the three main farming communities of Maharashtra - the difference being that the marathas and Kunbis were "dry farmers" whereas the Mali farmed throughout the year.
Professor Cynthia Talbot from the University of Texas quotes a saying in Maharashtra, "when a Kunbi prospers he becomes Maratha".
Kunbi origin has been one of the factors on the basis of which the head of Maharashtra State Backward Class Commission (MSBCC), a Judge, M.G. Gaikwad, and some others in 2018, stated that Maratha associations have submitted historical proofs and petitions to be included in the Other Backward Class. The decision for giving reservation in jobs and education for Marathas based on the petitions that Marathas and Kunbis are one and the same caste was upheld by the Mumbai court in 2019.

See also 

 List of Kunbi people
 Kunabi Sena
 Kudumbi
 Jat people
 Patidar

Footnotes

Notes

References 

 
 
 
 
 
 
 
 
 
 
 
 
 
 
 
 
 
 
 
 
 
 
 
 
 
 
 
 
 
 
 
 
 
 
 
 
 
 
 
 
 
 
 
 
 
 
 
 
 
 
 
 
 
 
 
 

Indian castes
Social groups of Maharashtra
Agricultural castes
Shudra castes
Other Backward Classes of Maharashtra